Coddle's Harbour is a community in the Canadian province of Nova Scotia, located in the Municipality of the District of Guysborough in Guysborough County.

References
 Coddle's Harbour on Destination Nova Scotia

Communities in Guysborough County, Nova Scotia
General Service Areas in Nova Scotia